Logroño Canton is a canton of Ecuador, located in the Morona-Santiago Province.  Its capital is the town of Logroño.  Its population at the 2001 census was 4,621. The current town of Logroño is in the vicinity of the lost 16th century mining town of Logroño de los Caballeros.

References

Cantons of Morona-Santiago Province